"Still Counting" is a song by Danish rock band Volbeat. "Still Counting" was released as a single in 2012, four years after its initial release on the Guitar Gangsters album. The song was a hit on American rock radio, reaching #1 on the Billboard Mainstream Rock chart, Volbeat's second single to do so.

Music video
A live music video was produced for the song and was filmed at the House of Blues in Anaheim, California. The music video was directed by Michael Sarna.

Track listing

Charts

Weekly charts

Year-end charts

Certifications

Personnel
 Michael Poulsen – vocals, rhythm guitar
 Thomas Bredahl – lead guitar
 Anders Kjølholm – bass
 Jon Larsen – drums

See also
List of Billboard Mainstream Rock number-one songs of the 2010s

References

External links
 Official Music Video on YouTube

2008 songs
2012 singles
Volbeat songs
Universal Records singles
Republic Records singles
Songs written by Michael Poulsen